Maurice O'Shea may refer to:
 Maurice O'Shea (hurler)
 Maurice O'Shea (winemaker)